Amgad Hosen (born 23 October 1975) is an Egyptian sports shooter. He competed in the Men's 10 metre air rifle event at the 2012 Summer Olympics.

References

External links
 

1975 births
Living people
Egyptian male sport shooters
Olympic shooters of Egypt
Shooters at the 2012 Summer Olympics
21st-century Egyptian people